XHPTCS-FM is a radio station on 95.5 FM in Tapachula, Chiapas, Mexico. It is owned by Grupo Radio Digital and known as Radio Mexicana.

History
XHPTCS was awarded in the IFT-4 radio auction of 2017 and came to air in 2018. It is the first commercial station operated by GRD in the market, as sister XHTPC-FM 106.7 is a social station.

After signing on as "Pop FM", the station flipped to grupera using the La Mejor brand from MVS Radio on August 30, 2019.

Most of GRD's stations dropped their MVS Radio franchised brands on May 1, 2021.

References

Radio stations in Chiapas
Radio stations established in 2018
2018 establishments in Mexico